Pineapple Express is a 2008 American stoner action comedy film directed by David Gordon Green, written by Seth Rogen and Evan Goldberg and starring Rogen and James Franco. The plot centers on a process server and his marijuana dealer as they are forced to flee from hitmen and a corrupt police officer after witnessing them commit a murder. Producer Judd Apatow, who previously worked with Rogen and Goldberg on Knocked Up and Superbad, assisted in developing the story.

Columbia Pictures released the film on August 6, 2008, and it grossed $102 million worldwide on a $26 million budget. The film received generally positive reviews from critics and has since developed a cult following. Franco was nominated for a Golden Globe Award for his performance.

Plot
Dale Denton, a process server and marijuana enthusiast, visits his drug dealer, Saul. Dale and Saul smoke the rare "Pineapple Express" strain together before Dale leaves to resume working. He arrives at the home of Ted Jones and witnesses Ted and police officer Carol Brazier shoot and kill an Asian man. While fleeing the scene, Dale throws his roach containing Pineapple Express. Ted identifies the strain and sends his henchmen Budlofsky and Matheson to Red, a drug dealer who tells them about Saul.

Back at Saul's apartment, Dale learns Ted is a local drug lord and could trace the roach as only Red and Saul have the Pineapple Express strain. Dale and Saul decide they must flee the city. They attempt to hide in the woods where Dale's car battery dies. Dale and Saul visit Red, who after a fight, reveals that Ted knows who they are and intends to kill them. Budlofsky and Matheson torture Red for information and both shoot him in the abdomen. Believing Dale’s high-schooler girlfriend Angie to be in danger, he and Saul travel to her home where they are removed at gunpoint by her father. Budlofsky and Matheson arrive at the house but Dale and Saul depart before they can be captured and Angie's family goes to a hotel.

Dale and Saul then sell Pineapple Express to raise bus fare but Dale is arrested by police officer Bobbra. Dale tells Bobbra that he witnessed Brazier and Ted murder a man. Bobbra has long been suspicious of Brazier's corruption and says she will investigate; Saul, thinking he is rescuing Dale, hijacks the police car. Brazier hears on police radio of Dale's arrest and pursues Dale and Saul in a high-speed chase but they escape. After Dale and Saul argue and split up, Saul is kidnapped and is held in Ted's lair. Dale breaks up with Angie over the phone after she talks about marriage. Dale then enlists an injured Red to help to rescue Saul but Red backs out at the last minute and Dale is captured. While Dale and Saul are waiting to be killed, they reconcile their friendship and plan an escape.

Ted's rivals, a Korean drug gang, attack the lair to avenge their fellow gangster's death. Dale and Saul free themselves but are caught by Matheson. A brawl and shootout ensues; Matheson kills Budlofsky for refusing to kill anyone. Red reappears and drives his car through the barn, killing Matheson and saving Saul but is shot by Brazier. A member of the Korean gang sets off a bomb killing Ted and setting fire to the barn. Red's car explodes and lands on Brazier, killing her. Dale carries Saul from the burning lair and Red, severely wounded, also escapes and reconciles with them. They talk about their adventure over breakfast at a diner before Saul's grandmother picks them up and takes them to the hospital.

Cast

 Seth Rogen as Dale Denton, a lazy process server and recreational marijuana smoker.
 James Franco as Saul Silver, a laid-back, friendly, airheaded drug dealer. He enjoys Dale's company and sees him as his friend, though Dale doesn't feel the same.
 Danny McBride as Red, Saul's hotheaded, slightly insane supplier.
 Gary Cole as Ted Jones, a ruthless, unhinged drug lord, who murders a member of a rival gang.
 Kevin Corrigan as Budlofsky, one of Jones' hitmen, who constantly worries about returning home for dinner with his wife.
 Craig Robinson as Matheson, Budlofsky's bumbling, slightly sympathetic partner.
 Rosie Perez as Carol Brazier, a corrupt Latin-American police officer, who assists Jones in the murder.
 Ken Jeong as Ken, the leader of the Korean gang.
 Amber Heard as Angie Anderson, Dale's 18-year-old girlfriend, who is still in high school.
 Ed Begley Jr. and Nora Dunn as Robert and Shannon Anderson, Angie's strict parents, who take an instant dislike to Dale and Saul.
 Joe Lo Truglio as Mr. Edwards, Angie's teacher.
 Cleo King as Police Liaison Officer Bobbra, a cop who is secretly suspicious of Brazier.
 Bill Hader as Private Miller, an American soldier who, in the opening flashback scene, smokes marijuana, while at the same time, revealing what he hates about the Army.
 James Remar as General Bratt, the soldier in charge of "Item 9" (marijuana), who, after hearing Private Miller's tirade, declares marijuana illegal.
 David McDivitt as Cop with Mole
 Troy Gentile as Troy Jones, Ted's son
 Connie Sawyer as Faye Belogus
 Arthur Napiontek as Clark
 Dana Lee as Cheung, the boss of the Korean gang.
 Bobby Lee as Bobby, Ken's brother
 Justin Long as Justin

Production
The inspiration for making Pineapple Express, according to producer Judd Apatow, was Brad Pitt's character in True Romance, a stoner named Floyd. Apatow "thought it would be funny to make a movie in which you follow that character out of his apartment and watch him get chased by bad guys". According to Rogen, the ideal production budget was $40 million, but due to the subject matter—"because it's a weed movie", as he described it—Sony Pictures allotted $25 million. The film inspired the name for a real cannabis strain called Pineapple Express.

David Gordon Green met with Apatow, Rogen and Goldberg on the set of Knocked Up and later on the set of Superbad to discuss the project. Green cited The Blues Brothers, Midnight Run, Running Scared, The Gravy Train and Stir Crazy as sources of inspiration and influence on directing the film. One particular aspect of the film that has been almost universally praised is the cinematography; Rogen even joked on the commentary that "even people who hate the movie admit that it's shot well".

Rogen was originally going to play Saul, but Apatow suggested that Franco should play the role instead. After a table read, Rogen agreed, thus casting himself in the role of Dale Denton.

Seth Rogen spoke with musician Huey Lewis about writing and performing the film's theme song in November 2007.

Release

Box office
Sony released the film on Wednesday, August 6, 2008 and it grossed $12.1 million on its first day. Over the weekend, it opened at number two behind The Dark Knight with $23.2 million, a five-day total of $41.3 million. The film went on to gross $87.3 million in the U.S. and Canada and $14.2 million in other territories, for a worldwide total of $101.5 million.

Marketing
A red-band trailer for the film, featuring the song "Paper Planes" by M.I.A., leaked in February 2008. Sony Pictures had the video removed from YouTube within a few days of its posting. Patrick Goldstein's Summer Movie Posse of the Los Angeles Times described its incorporation as "the most impressive use of M.I.A.'s 'Paper Planes' ever". The film's makers had been keen on including the song in the film's main trailer and approached M.I.A.'s U.S. label Interscope Records for permission. She added "Interscope asked me and I was, like, well, since it’s just the trailer, that’s cool. I didn’t really think twice about it" stating she would have thought more carefully about permitting the song's use if it was in the main film, "scrutinizing what scene they were using it in and stuff like that". Pineapple Express had an advance screening at the Just for Laughs Film Festival on July 19, 2008. The film was released on August 6, 2008. Cable network FX pre-bought exclusive rights to air the film after its theatrical run.

There was a sneak peek of the film attached to the Superbad DVD, released on December 4, 2007.

Home media
The film was released on DVD and Blu-ray on January 6, 2009. Both rated and unrated versions of the film are available. It was released on DVD and Blu-ray in Australia on December 31, 2008. Both the Blu-ray and 2-disc DVD versions of the film come with a digital copy of the unrated film. It was released on 4K Ultra HD Blu-ray on March 1, 2016.

Reception 
The site's critical consensus reads, "Both funny and scatter shot, this loose-knit action/buddy/stoner comedy bridges genres and keeps a steady tempo of low ball laughs." On Metacritic, the film has a weighted average score of 64 out of 100, based on 37 critics, indicating "generally favorable reviews". Audiences polled by CinemaScore gave the film an average grade of "B+" on an A+ to F scale.

Michael Phillips of the Chicago Tribune praised the film's script, noting that it "recalls what made Superbad worth seeing: the sidewinding conversational riffs, the why-am-I-laughing? wordplay." However, he was critical of the second half of the film, and felt that the violence in contrast to the comedy of the first half was jarring and gratuitous. Kelly Vance of East Bay Express enjoyed Franco's performance, stating that he "steals the movie easily", as well as the authenticity of the film's sets.

Soundtrack
The original motion picture soundtrack to the film was released on August 5, 2008. Although featured in the trailer for the film, the song "Paper Planes" by M.I.A. is not used in the film or included on its soundtrack. Following the trailer's release, "Paper Planes" gained massive airplay and reached the top 5 on the Billboard Hot 100 singles chart. Also featured in the film but absent from the soundtrack album are Grace Jones' Sly and Robbie produced cover of Johnny Cash's "Ring of Fire", the former of which can be found on her 1998 compilation Private Life: The Compass Point Sessions.

 "Pineapple Express" by Huey Lewis and the News (4:27)
 "Electric Avenue" by Eddy Grant (3:48)
 "Dr. Greenthumb" by Cypress Hill (3:08)
 "Lost at Birth" by Public Enemy (3:33)
 "Poison" by Bell Biv DeVoe (4:20)
 "Wanted Dread and Alive" by Peter Tosh (4:22)
 "Don't Look Around" by Mountain (3:44)
 "Pineapple Chase (aka The Reprise of the Phoenix)" by Graeme Revell (3:03)
 "Bird's Lament" by Moondog & The London Saxophonic (2:02)
 "Coconut Girl" by Brother Noland (3:36)
 "Hi'ilawe" by Arthur Lyman (1:09)
 "Time Will Tell" by Bob Marley (3:31)
 "Tha Crossroads" by Bone Thugs-n-Harmony (3:45)
 "Pineapple Fight (aka The Nemesis Proclaimed)" by Graeme Revell (3:08)
 "I Didn't Mean to Hurt You" by Spiritualized (5:12)
 "Everybody Have Fun Tonight" by Wang Chung (4:48)
 "Woke Up Laughing" by Robert Palmer (3:35)

Cancelled sequel 
Due to the film's financial success and cult following, Rogen, Goldberg, and Apatow were interested in producing a second film. The project never came to fruition, with Rogen saying "I think we probably wanted too much money" (Apatow had placed the necessary cost of a sequel at $50 million, with Sony capping it at $45 million). In order to promote Rogen's 2013 film This Is the End, which also starred Franco, Robinson, and McBride, Sony released a fake trailer for Pineapple Express 2 as an April Fool's Day prank. According to Rogen and Goldberg, the homemade Pineapple Express 2 film in This Is the End depicts what they envision for the actual sequel.

After the 2014 Sony hack, emails were leaked confirming the budget disagreement. Rogen also confirmed this in a 2020 interview.

References

External links

 
 
 
 
 
 

2008 films
2008 action comedy films
2008 black comedy films
2000s crime comedy films
2000s buddy comedy films
American films about cannabis
American action comedy films
American black comedy films
American crime comedy films
American buddy comedy films
Films about murderers
Films about smoking
Films partially in color
Films set in 1937
Films set in 2007
Films set in California
Films shot in Los Angeles
Triad films
Apatow Productions films
Columbia Pictures films
Relativity Media films
Films scored by Graeme Revell
Films directed by David Gordon Green
Films produced by Judd Apatow
Works about cannabis trafficking
Films with screenplays by Seth Rogen
Stoner films
2008 comedy films
Films with screenplays by Evan Goldberg
2000s English-language films
2000s American films
2000s Hong Kong films
Films about runaways